"I'll Be There for You" is a song by American pop rock duo the Rembrandts. The song was written by David Crane, Marta Kauffman, Michael Skloff, and Allee Willis as the main theme song to the NBC sitcom Friends, which was broadcast from 1994 to 2004. American rock band R.E.M. was originally asked to allow one of their songs to be used for the Friends theme, but they turned the opportunity down. "I'll Be There for You" was subsequently written and Warner Bros. Television selected the only available band on Warner Bros. Records to record it: the Rembrandts. In 1995, after a Nashville radio station brought the song to mainstream popularity, Rembrandts members Danny Wilde and Phil Sōlem expanded the theme song with two new verses and included this version on their third studio album, L.P. (1995).

The extended version of the song was serviced to US radio on May 23, 1995, and was issued in the United Kingdom on August 7, 1995, as the first single from L.P. Following the song's release, it reached the top 10 in Australia, New Zealand and Norway, as well as in Ireland and the United Kingdom in both 1995 and 1997. In Canada, the song reached number one for five weeks and was the most successful single of 1995, while in the United States, the song reached number 17 on the Billboard Hot 100 and topped the Billboard Hot 100 Airplay chart for eight weeks.

Background and release
The title theme of Friends was initially going to be "Shiny Happy People" by American rock band R.E.M., but when the band rejected the offer, Warner Bros. Television instead decided to recreate R.E.M.'s sound by enlisting the Rembrandts to write an original theme. The Rembrandts did not want to record the song, but since they were the only available band on Warner Bros. Records, they relented to the company's demands. The original lyrics of "I'll Be There for You", a single verse as needed for the length of the series' opening credits, were co-written by Friends producers David Crane and Marta Kauffman, with songwriter Allee Willis. The Rembrandts members Phil Sōlem and Danny Wilde later lengthened it by writing the second verse and bridge. The music was composed by Kauffman's husband, Michael Skloff. Skloff became inspired by hearing the Beatles song "Paperback Writer" on the radio while reading a show script and sought to capture a mid-1960s pop sound for the theme.

The original theme, which is under one minute long, was later re-recorded as a three-minute pop song. After Nashville program director Charlie Quinn, along with radio announcer and music director Tom Peace, looped the original short version into a full-length track and broadcast it on radio station WYHY, it became so popular that they had to re-record it. "Our record label said we had to finish the song and record it. There was no way to get out of it," lead singer Phil Sōlem said. The handclaps at the end of the first line of the song were a last-minute addition, with Sōlem admitting that it was a wise decision and naming it the best part of the track. The three-minute version of "I'll Be There for You" was serviced to American contemporary hit radio on May 23, 1995. In the United Kingdom, a CD single and cassette single were issued on August 7, 1995. On May 12, 1997, the CD and cassette were re-issued in the UK to commemorate the video release of the first season of Friends.

Composition
"I'll Be There for You" is an upbeat song about traveling, dead-end jobs, and friendship.

Critical reception
In 2009, the song was listed by Blender as one of the "50 Worst Songs Ever". Conversely, several magazines have listed the song as one of the best TV theme songs, including Paste, Complex, and Observer.

Chart performance
"I'll Be There for You" topped the US Billboard Hot 100 Airplay chart for eight weeks and also peaked atop the Billboard Hot Adult Contemporary and Mainstream Top 40 charts. At the peak of its popularity, the song was not available as a commercial single, therefore becoming the first song to top the Hot 100 Airplay chart without appearing on the Hot 100. On the Billboard Hot 100, when it was later released commercially along with the band's next single, it reached number 17 as a double A-side with "This House Is Not a Home". In Canada, the song peaked at number one for five consecutive weeks and was the most successful single of 1995. In the United Kingdom, it reached number three on the UK Singles Chart, and it peaked at the same position on the Irish Singles Chart the same year. In Scotland, it topped the country's singles chart. The song sold 322,000 copies in the UK during 1995.

While the song did not immediately make a significant commercial impact in Australia, peaking at number 86 in October 1995, it soon re-entered the ARIA Singles Chart in August 1996 and peaked at number three on the week of October 13, spending a total of 20 weeks in the top 50. In 1997, when re-released in Europe, the song reached the top 10 in Ireland and the United Kingdom once more, placing two positions shy of its number-three peak in both countries. This re-release also saw the song reach the top 40 in Flanders, France, the Netherlands, Norway, and Sweden. As of May 2021, "I'll Be There for You" has sold 925,000 copies and has been streamed 20.7 million times in the UK since streaming figures were introduced in 2014. According to the Official Charts Company, the song is streamed an average of 96,000 times a week.

Music video
The video features the band performing in a studio while the cast of Friends join in. Some scenes are shot in black-and-white. The Rembrandts members Phil Sōlem and Danny Wilde disclosed during a live interview on The Today Show on September 20, 2019, to celebrate the 25th anniversary of the song that the video was shot on the set of SNL (Studio 8H).

Track listings
Several formats of the single feature snippets of six tracks from L.P. These tracks are "Don't Hide Your Love", "End of the Beginning", "Lovin' Me Insane", "Drowning in Your Tears", "This House Is Not a Home", and "What Will It Take".

1995 release
US 7-inch vinyl and European CD single
 "I'll Be There for You (Theme from Friends)" – 3:09
 Album snippets – 6:42

UK 7-inch and cassette single
 "I'll Be There for You (Theme from Friends)" – 3:09
 Fixin' to Blow – 5:03
 The cassette single was reissued in 1997

1997 release
European and Australian CD single
 "I'll Be There for You (Theme from Friends)" – 3:09
 "Fixin' to Blow" – 5:03
 "Just the Way It Is, Baby" – 4:06
 Snippets medley – 6:46

Personnel
Credits are lifted from the European CD single liner notes.
 Marta Kauffman – lyrics, executive production
 David Crane – lyrics, executive production
 Michael Skloff – music, Hammond organ
 Danny Wilde – lyrics, vocals, bass, acoustic guitar, percussion
 Phil Sōlem – lyrics, vocals, electric guitar
 Pat Mastelotto – drums
 Gavin MacKillop – production
 Kevin S. Bright – executive production

Charts

Weekly charts

Year-end charts

Certifications

Release history

Cover versions
 American pop rock band The Goo Goo Dolls recorded their own version of this song which contained slightly altered lyrics, and a more upbeat tempo, rockier sound, as well as a glockenspiel in the rhythm track.
 American punk rock band Pink Lincolns covered this song under the title "Friends" for a 1997 compilation album titled Show & Tell.
 Meghan Trainor covered the song on September 22, 2019, to celebrate the Friends 25th Anniversary at the Empire State Building light show.

In popular culture
On the 25th anniversary of the show, Jonas Brothers appeared in a music video of the theme song featuring Priyanka Chopra Jonas, Sophie Turner and Danielle Jonas.

See also
 List of Billboard Mainstream Top 40 number-one songs of the 1990s
 List of number-one adult contemporary singles of 1995 (U.S.)
 List of number-one singles of 1995 (Canada)

References

1994 songs
1995 singles
1997 singles
Atlantic Records singles
East West Records singles
Elektra Records singles
Friends (1994 TV series)
Number-one singles in Scotland
RPM Top Singles number-one singles
Songs about friendship
Songs written by Allee Willis
Comedy television theme songs
The Rembrandts songs